Gerald M. Pomper is an American political scientist and specialist in American elections and politics. Pomper is the Board of Governors Professor Emeritus of Political Science at the Eagleton Institute of Politics of Rutgers University.

Biography 
Pomper was born in the Bronx in 1935 to Jewish immigrants from Poland. He grew up in Manhattan and graduated from Stuyvesant High School. He received his B.A. from Columbia University in 1955 on a Ford Foundation scholarship, majoring in political science and serving as managing editor of Columbia Daily Spectator. He then received his Ph.D. from Princeton University.

He began his academic career at the City College of New York, before moving to Rutgers University and served as the founding chair of the political science department of Livingston College. He was a Fulbright scholar in 1971–72, teaching at Tel Aviv University.

Pomper has been described as a leading authority in the field of election studies and was called the "Dean of American Political Science" by political historian Allan Lichtman.

References 

Living people
1935 births
People from the Bronx
Columbia College (New York) alumni
Princeton University alumni
City College of New York faculty
Rutgers University faculty
American political scientists
Stuyvesant High School alumni